The 1925–26 Luxembourg National Division was the 16th season of top level association football in Luxembourg.

Overview
It was performed in seven teams, and FA Red Boys Differdange won the championship.

League standings

Results

References
Luxembourg - List of final tables (RSSSF)

Luxembourg National Division seasons
Lux
Nat